Montpelier station, also known as Montpelier–Berlin station and Montpelier Junction, is a railroad station in Berlin, Vermont, United States. It is served by Amtrak's Vermonter line and provides service to the nearby cities of Montpelier and Barre.

A railroad station has stood at this site since the mid-19th century. Originally a freight stop for wood, the Vermont Central Railroad (VCR) established a junction station for passengers known as Montpelier Junction in 1849. That year, VCR built a branch line to downtown Montpelier, providing service to Vermont's capital. The current station was built in 1934 by the Central Vermont Railway, VCR's successor. It is likely the third station building on the site. 

Regular service on the Montpelier branch was discontinued in 1938 and replaced with a bus line. Service to Montpelier Junction ended altogether in 1966. In 1972, Amtrak restored service to the station on the Montrealer line, which was later replaced by the Vermonter when service to Montreal ended.

References

External links

Amtrak stations in Vermont
Buildings and structures in Montpelier, Vermont
Transportation buildings and structures in Washington County, Vermont
Former Central Vermont Railway stations